Calipari is a surname. Notable people with the name include:

Erin Calipari, American professor and college basketball player, daughter of John Calipari 
John Calipari (born 1959), American basketball coach
Nicola Calipari (1953–2005), Italian major general